The 2010 United States House of Representatives elections in Connecticut took place on Tuesday, November 2, 2010 to elect the five Congressional representatives from the state, one from each of the state's five Congressional districts. The elections coincided with the elections of other federal and state offices, including governor, U.S. Senate, and state legislature races.

The incumbent state Congressional delegation, elected in 2008, consisted of five Democratic representatives. All were re-elected in the 2010 elections.

Primary elections were necessary to select Republican candidates in all districts except the Third, while no Democratic candidates faced primary challenges. The GOP primaries took place on Tuesday, August 10, 2010.

Overview
The table below shows the total number and percentage of votes, as well as the number of seats gained and lost by each political party in the election for the United States House of Representatives in Connecticut. In addition, the voter turnout and the number of votes not valid will be listed below.   

† Includes 33,036 votes received on the line of the Connecticut Working Families Party, which cross-endorsed the Democratic candidate in each of the five districts.‡ Includes 2,310 votes received by Republican Sam Caliguiri on the independent line in the Fifth District.

By district
Results of the 2010 United States House of Representatives elections in Connecticut by district:

District 1
Incumbent Democratic Congressman John B. Larson was challenged by Republican Ann Brickley, Green Party candidate Kenneth J. Krayeske, and Socialist Action candidate Christopher J. Hutchinson.
Race ranking and details from CQ Politics
Campaign contributions from OpenSecrets
Race profile at The New York Times

Polling
October polls conducted by the website CT Capitol Report showed Larson leading Brickley by seven- and 18-point margins.

Results

Note: Larson also appeared on the line of the Connecticut Working Families Party and received 7,902 votes on it. His Working Families and Democratic votes have been aggregated together on this table.

District 2
Incumbent Democratic Congressman Joe Courtney was challenged by Republican Janet Peckinpaugh, a former NBC Connecticut anchorwoman. Also running was Green Party candidate Scott Deshefy. Courtney was also cross-endorsed by the Connecticut Working Families Party.
Race ranking and details from CQ Politics
Campaign contributions from OpenSecrets
Race profile at The New York Times

Polling
October polls conducted by the website CT Capitol Report had shown Courtney leading Peckinpaugh by 14- and 19-point margins.

Results

Note: Courtney also appeared on the line of the Connecticut Working Families Party and received 6,860 votes on it. His Working Families and Democratic votes have been aggregated together on this table.

District 3
Incumbent Democratic Congresswoman Rosa L. DeLauro was challenged by Connecticut Republican Party treasurer Jerry Labriola Jr. and Green Party nominee Charles Pillsbury.
Race ranking and details from CQ Politics
Campaign contributions from OpenSecrets
Race profile at The New York Times

Polling
October polls conducted by the website CT Capitol Report had shown DeLauro leading Labriola by the largest margins of any of the state's five congressional districts.

Results

Note: DeLauro also appeared on the line of the Connecticut Working Families Party and received 9,021 votes on it. Her Working Families and Democratic votes have been aggregated together on this table.

District 4
Incumbent Democratic Congressman Jim Himes was challenged by Republican State Senator Dan Debicella.
Race ranking and details from CQ Politics
Campaign contributions from OpenSecrets
Race profile at The New York Times

Polling
October polling had shown this race to have essentially been a toss-up.

Results

Note: Himes also appeared on the line of the Connecticut Working Families Party and received 4,605 votes on it. His Working Families and Democratic votes have been aggregated together on this table.

District 5
Incumbent Democratic Congressman Chris Murphy was challenged by Republican State Senator Sam Caligiuri.
Race ranking and details from CQ Politics
Campaign contributions from OpenSecrets
Race profile at The New York Times

Polling
The last polling in this district before the election, as conducted by the website CT Capitol Report, had essentially indicated this race was a toss up.

† Internal poll commissioned for Murphy campaign

Results

Note: Murphy also appeared on the line of the Connecticut Working Families Party and received 4,648 votes on it. His Working Families and Democratic votes have been aggregated together on this table. Caligiuri also appeared on the independent line and received 2,310 votes on it. His independent and Republican votes have been aggregated together on this table.

References

General references
http://www.thegreenpapers.com/G10/CT

External links
Elections & Voting from the Connecticut Secretary of State
Official list of Candidates 11/02/2010 General (non-write in)
U.S. Congress candidates for Connecticut at Project Vote Smart
Connecticut U.S. House from OurCampaigns.com
Campaign contributions for U.S. Congressional races in Connecticut from OpenSecrets
2010 Connecticut General Election graph of multiple polls from Pollster.com

House - Connecticut from the Cook Political Report

Official campaign sites
Ann Brickley for Congress (R-1)
Sam Caligiuri for Congress (R-5)
Joe Courtney for Congress (D-2)
Dan Debicella for Congress (R-4)
Rosa DeLauro for Congress (D-3)
Jim Himes for Congress (D-4)
Jerry Labriola for Congress (R-3)
John Larson for Congress (D-1)
Chris Murphy for Congress (D-5)
Janet Peckinpaugh for Congress (R-2)

Connecticut
2010
2010 Connecticut elections